Edward John May (1853–1941) was an English architect.

Career

E.J. May was the last pupil of Decimus Burton. He then went to the assist Eden Nesfield who was at the time working in partnership with Richard Norman Shaw. He entered the Royal Academy Schools in 1873, and won the RIBA Pugin Prize in 1876.

Shaw commended May as Estate Architect at Bedford Park, London in 1880 and May held that post until 1885. He lived at 6 Queen Anne's Grove, Bedford Park from 1881 to 1890.

He was architect to the Church of England Waifs and Strays Society and to the Governesses' Benevolent Institution. His office was at Hart Street, Bloomsbury, London. He retired in 1932.

From the 1890s he was a resident of Chislehurst, Kent, where he was responsible for a wide range of houses. He lived firstly on Willow Grove, before moving to a house of his own design in 1913. At Chislehurst, he was a Church Warden at the Church of the Annunciation, Chislehurst High Street as well as Secretary of the Parish Nurse Fund.

He died at Chislehurst on 16 March 1941.

"To know E. J. May was an exhilarating tonic, the serious and yet lighthearted activity of thought and action, the quick movement to keep an appointment or to see you on your homeward way was characteristic."

Works up to 1900

1870s – 1880s Houses at Bedford Park
1877 No. 1 The Avenue, Bedford Park
1879 Club House, Bedford Park
1880 No 12 Blenheim Drive, Bedford Park (attrib)
1880 Nos 17 – 19 Marlborough Crescent, Bedford Park (attrib)
1881 The Vicarage, Bedford Park
1882 Nos 21 – 39 Marlborough Crescent, Bedford Park (attrib)
1882 Nos 15 – 33 Queen Anne's Grove, Bedford Park
1882 Nos 24 – 28 Queen Anne's Grove, Bedford Parkga
1882 Nos 2 – 10 Newton Grove, Bedford Park
1882 No 1 Newton Grove, Bedford Park
1882 No 11 South Parade, Bedford Park (attrib)
1882 Master's House, The School, Derby
1883 nos 15 – 25 Queen Anne's Grove, London
1883 New Hotel Bush Hill Park, Enfield
1883 nos 3 – 4 Gainsborough Gardens, Hampstead, London
1883 House for Dr Hogg, Priory Gardens, Bedford Park, London
1884–85 St Margaret's Terrace, Cromer, Norfolk
1884 Swarland Hall, Northumberland
1884 Stables, Swarland Hall
1884 No 5 The Orchard, Bedford Park
1885 House at Wimbledon, London
1885 Club Room, Bedford Park
1886 Herne's Close, Overstrand Road, Cromer, Norfolk
1887 House at Elstree
1889 No 2 The Grange, Wimbledon
1889 Folkton Manor House
1890 Barnsdale Hall, near Oakham, Rutland
1891 House at Hampstead
1892 Kirklevington Grange, North Riding
1892 House in Connecticut, USA
1892 Lyneham, Chislehurst, Kent (his own home)
1895 The Croft, Hindhead, Surrey
1894 West Lodge, Wimbledon
1895 Stables at Shaw Hill, Wiltshire
1895 Houses at Gainsborough Gardens, Hampstead, London
1894-8 Jardine Hall, Drumfrieshire, Scotland
1898 Saxby's St Paul's Cray Road, Chislehurst (alts)

Works 1900 – 1930
1900 Homeside, no 4 South Side, Wimbledon
1901 Norman Cottage, Morley Road, Chislehurst
1902 Falconhurst, no 19 Parkside, Wimbledon
1900–05 Branksome Place (formerly Hilders, then Branksome Hilders), Hindhead Rd, Haselmere, Surrey, for Sir Charles McLaren, bt. (later 1st Baron Aberconway)
1900–05 Honeyhanger, Haselmere, Surrey, for Sir Charles McLaren, bt. (later 1st Baron Aberconway)
1900–05 10 Palace Green, London
1904 Nos 165 – 169 Lower Camden, Chislehurst
1904 New Entrance Lodges, Toddington, Gloucestershire
1905 Ballindune, Weydown Road, Haslemere
1906–07 Saxby's St Paul's Cray Road, Chislehurst (further alts)
1907 Nos 1, 2 and 4 Shepherd's Green, Chislehurst
1907 Dunoran, Park Farm Road, Bickley.
1908 Nos 3 and 5 Shepherd's Green, Chislehurst
1908 House at Webbington, Somerset
1908 Three Firs, Hindhead, Surrey
1909 Western Motor Works, Perry Street, Chislehurst
1909 The Homestead, 9 Holbrook Lane, Chislehurst
1910 Waifs and Strays' Home, Pyford, Surrey
1910 Working Men's Club (British Legion), 76 Green Lane, Chislehurst
1910 Nos 1 – 5 Beaverwood Road, Chislehurst
1910 – 11 Guild hall, Sandwich, Kent (alts)
1910 White Riggs, Mead Road, Chislehurst
1910 Sweet Meadows, Mead Road, Chislehurst
1910 Nos 1 5 Beaverwood Road, Chislehurst (attrib)
1911 House at Boyne Park, Tunbridge Wells
1911 No 48 Parkway, Gidea Park, Essex
1911 No 10 Reed Pond Walk, Gidea Park, Essex
1911 House at Toddington, Gloucestershire
1911 Lych Gate at Church of the Annunciation, High Street, Chislehurst
1912 Antokol (formerly Oak House), Holbrook Lane, Chislehurst
1913 Wallings (formerly Lyneham), Heathfield Lane, Chislehurst (own house)
1914 Millfield, Cricketground Road, Chislehurst (demolished)
1915 Red Hatch, 55 Elmstead Lane, Chislehurst (erected 1920)
1920s Elmstead Spinney, no 5 Wood Drive, Chislehurst
1922 Mainstay Lodge, Holbrook Lane, Chislehurst (demolished)
1924 St Anne's Cottage, no 6 The Meadow, Chislehurst
1925 Ada Lewis Governesses' Homes, Southend Road, Beckenham, Kent
1926 Quatre Fils (formerly Harwood), 41 Holbrook Lane, Chislehurst
1927 Lockers, Holbrook Lane, Chislehurst
1928 Archway Cottages, Scadbury Estate, Chislehurst
1930 Moorcroft (formerly Exbourne), Wilderness Road, Chislehurst
1930 Tower at Church of the Annunciation, High Street, Chislehurst
 Lychgate to St Mary's Church, Perivale, Middlesex

Other work

Sketch of a Queen Anne Interior (Orchard House)
 Royal Academy Exhibitor annually from 1881–1892 and also 1894, 1898 and 1900.

References

External links
 https://web.archive.org/web/20070220164223/http://www.codexgeo.co.uk/dsa/architect_full.php?id=M001656

Architects from London
1941 deaths
1853 births